Sulzbach an der Murr is a municipality in the district of Rems-Murr in Baden-Württemberg, Germany.

History

Geography
The municipality (Gemeinde) of Sulzbach an der Murr is located in the Rems-Murr district, in the German state of Baden-Württemberg. Sulzbach's municipal area is physically located in the between the Löwenstein Hills and Murrhardt Forest, regions of the greater Swabian-Franconian Forest. Elevation above sea level in the municipal area ranges from a high of  Normalnull (NN) to a low of  NN.

Politics
Sulzbach has one borough (Ortsteil), Sulzbach an der Murr, and 17 villages: Bartenbach, Berwinkel, Bushof, Eschelhof, Eschenstruet, Gronbachmühle, Hager, Hammer, Harrenberg, Haselbachmühle, Ittenberg, Kleinhöchberg, Lautern, Liemannsklinge, Schleißweiler, Siebersbach, and Zwerenberg. The abandoned villages of Alte Sägmühle, Einsiedel, Wüste Mühl are located in Sulzbach's municipal area.

Coat of arms
Sulzbach's coat of arms is divided party per fess into an upper, yellow half containing a lion in red facing to the left, and a lower, blue half containing a white fish. The red lion is taken from the arms of Löwenstein-Wertheim while the fish is a reference to Sulzbach's abundance of waterways. This coat of arms has been used since 1650 in town seals since 1650. On 18 February 1981, the Rems-Murr district office issued a municipal flag to Sulzbach.

Transportation
Sulzbach an der Murr is connected to Germany's network of roadways by the Bundesstraße 14 and its system of railways by the Waiblingen–Schwäbisch Hall railway. Local public transportation is provided by the Verkehrs- und Tarifverbund Stuttgart.

References

External links

  (in German)

Rems-Murr-Kreis
Württemberg